The Chinese Ambassador to Hungary is the official representative of the People's Republic of China to Hungary.

List of representatives

References 

 
Hungary
China